Vulcan (formerly Jiu-Vaidei-Vulcan; , Zsilyvajdejvulkán (Zsily-Vajdej-Vulkán)) is a city in Hunedoara County, Transylvania, Romania. With a population of 24,160, it is the second-largest city in the Jiu Valley. It administers two villages, Dealul Babii ("Old Woman's Hill" in Romanian; Hegyvulkán) and Jiu-Paroșeni (Zsilymacesdparoseny).

The city is named after the Vulcan Pass that connects the Jiu Valley to Oltenia, itself being derived from Slavic "vlk", meaning "wolf" (even if "vulcan" means "volcano" in Romanian).

The coal resources of the region were discovered in 1788 while the Austrian General Landau defended Vulcan from the Ottoman Turks. One night the soldiers could not put out the camp fire they made, as the piles of coal underneath had caught fire. General Landau thought that he could stop the Turks without a fight by setting piles of coal on fire. The Turks noted the large numbers of fires on the heights and thought that the Austrian army was much larger than theirs and retreated.

In 1850, the first mine was set up by the Hoffman brothers of Brașov.

Demographics 

 Romanians: 92.91%
 Hungarians: 5.13%
 Romani: 1.41%
 Germans: 0.2%

People 
 Pius Brânzeu
 Ernő Csíki
 Andrej Prean Nagy
 Ștefan Onisie
 Leonard Wolf

Twin cities

List of Vulcan's sister and twin cities:

  Bor, Serbia

See also 
 Jiu Valley
 CS Vulcan
 Vulcan Pass

References

External links 

 Jiu Valley Portal - the regional portal host of the official Jiu Valley municipal websites

Populated places in Hunedoara County
Localities in Transylvania
Jiu Valley
Cities in Romania
Mining communities in Romania
Monotowns in Romania